Aq Dagh-e Olya (also Romanized as  Āq Dāgh-e ‘Olyā; also known as Āgh Dāgh Kūh, Āqdāgh-e Bālā and Āqdāgh Rūd) is a village in Qaranqu Rural District, in the Central District of Hashtrud County, East Azerbaijan Province, Iran. At the 2006 census, its population was 109, in 21 families.

References 

Towns and villages in Hashtrud County